Charles Marley Anderson (January 5, 1845 – December 28, 1908) was an American Civil War veteran and a United States representative from the Fourth District of the U.S. state of Ohio. He served one term from 1885 to 1887.

Early life and career 
Charles Marley Anderson was born in Mifflinburg, Pennsylvania, in 1845, and moved with his parents to Darke County, Ohio, in 1855. Three of his four grandparents were born in Ireland.

He attended the common schools, and enlisted in Company B, 71st Ohio Infantry, in 1861 during the American Civil War. He served until honorably discharged in 1865. He attended the National Normal University in Lebanon, Ohio, in 1866, studied law, and commenced practice in Greenville, Ohio, in 1868.

Congress 
Anderson was elected as a Democrat to Ohio's 4th congressional district in 1884, and failed at re-nomination in 1886. He served March 4, 1885, to March 3, 1887. He was named by Governor James E. Campbell as an Ohio commissioner to the World's Columbian Exposition of 1892.

Death 
Anderson died at Greenville on December 28, 1908, and is buried at Greenville Cemetery.

Charles Marley Anderson married Ella Hart of Greenville on June 7, 1870. They had two sons. He was a member of the Improved Order of Red Men, Knights of Pythias, Masonic Order, and Grand Army of the Republic.

References

External links 

1845 births
1908 deaths
People from Union County, Pennsylvania
People from Darke County, Ohio
National Normal University alumni
Union Army soldiers
People of Ohio in the American Civil War
Ohio lawyers
Democratic Party members of the United States House of Representatives from Ohio
American people of Irish descent
19th-century American politicians
People from Greenville, Ohio